(ATLAS) is a Jupiter-family comet discovered by the Asteroid Terrestrial-impact Last Alert System on 10 June 2019. It was initially reported as the first known Jupiter trojan asteroid to display cometary activity, but its classification as a Jupiter trojan was retracted after closer examination and a longer observation arc revealed its orbit to be unstable like a typical Jupiter family comet and implied that its position near the trojans is temporary.

Discovery 
 was discovered in images by the Asteroid Terrestrial-impact Last Alert System (ATLAS) at the Mauna Loa Observatory taken on 10 June 2019. Later observations by the ATLAS-MLO in April 2020 showed that  still retained its cometary appearance, suggesting that it has been continuously active for almost a year.

The discovery of 's cometary activity was announced in a press release by the University of Hawaiʻi Institute for Astronomy on 20 May 2020, purporting it as the first known active Jupiter trojan, as it was discovered near Jupiter's  Lagrangian point where the Greek camp trojans reside. However, upon closer examination of 's orbital dynamics by amateur astronomer Sam Deen,  was found to be a Jupiter-family comet with a chaotic orbit instead of a Jupiter trojan. Subsequently, the comet was reclassified and was given the periodic comet designation  (ATLAS) by the Minor Planet Center on 22 May 2020.

Orbit and classification 

 orbits the Sun at a mean distance of 5.29 AU once every 12.18 years. Its orbit has an eccentricity of 0.135 and an inclination of 11.6 degrees with respect to the ecliptic. The body's observation arc begins with a precovery, published by the Pan-STARRS 1 survey and taken at Haleakala Observatory on 21 May 2018, or 11 months prior to its official discovery observation by the ALTAS-MLO survey.

 is a Jupiter-family comet with a Tisserand parameter of 2.94, typical for other Jupiter-family comets. Unlike the Jupiter trojans,  is 21 degrees ahead of Jupiter, and will continue drifting 30 degrees ahead before returning to Jupiter and making close approaches.  is now following what looks like a short arc of a quasi-satellite cycle with respect to Jupiter that started in 2017 and will end in 2028.

 On 2063 January 23, it will have a very close encounter with Jupiter at 0.016 AU; orbital predictions after this flyby are rather uncertain.

Physical characteristics 
Based on a generic magnitude-to-diameter conversion,  measures approximately 14 kilometers in diameter, for an assumed albedo of 0.12 as the median for small Jupiter trojans, and an absolute magnitude of 12.2. , no rotational light curve of  has been obtained from photometric observations. The body's rotation period, pole and shape remain unknown. The visible spectrum does not exhibit any evidence of CN, C2, or C3 emission.

During the approach to perihelion in 2020, the comet shed large-grained (0.1 mm typical) dust grains rich with water ice.

See also 
 6478 Gault
 7968 Elst–Pizarro
 118401 LINEAR

References

External links 
 UPDATE: Astronomers recategorize asteroid-like comet detected by ATLAS telescope, NASA Solar System Exploration, 28 May 2020
 Jupiter Has Trapped a Comet in a Bizarre Orbit, Jeff Hect, Sky & Telescope, 28 May 2020
 Astronomers recategorize asteroid-like comet detected by UH ATLAS telescope, University of Hawaiʻi News, 26 May 2020
 UH ATLAS telescope discovers first-of-its-kind asteroid, University of Hawaiʻi Institute for Astronomy, 20 May 2020
 
 

Cometary object articles

Centaurs (small Solar System bodies)
Comets in 2020
20190610
Discoveries by ATLAS